The Republic of Turkey has been a secular state since the constitutional amendment of 1937. Mustafa Kemal Atatürk introduced the secularization of the state in the Turkish Constitution of 1924, alongside his reforms. Over 95% of Turkey's population is Muslim, and the suppression of hijab/headscarves and other prominent religious symbols in  government institutions and public schools, 
(similar to policies in France, Quebec and Mexico)  has led to heated controversy at times in Turkey. Specifically, it has resulted in a clash between those favoring the secular principles of the state, such as the Turkish Armed Forces, and religious conservatives, including Islamists.  In the 21st century, since 2003, the Justice and Development Party (AKP) and its leader Recep Tayyip Erdoğan, have worked to reverse this, and “raise a pious generation” in Turkey.

Atatürk never forbade the headscarf (the dominant form of hijab in Turkey wear it is called basortusu), but actively discouraged its use in public venues. The headscarf was banned in public institutions because of the 'public clothing regulation' issued after the 1980 coup and began to be implemented in a radical way after the 1997 military memorandum. However, the ban on the headscarf for public personnel was lifted by the democratization package  on 1 October 2013. Restrictive provisions were lifted with the amendment made in article 5 of the dress code regulation,  but  remained in effect in the military, police force and judiciary. 
In a reflection of how far laïcité has fallen in Turkey as of October 2022, both Turkey's Islamist government and the formerly secular opposition  vowed in that month to take "legal steps to enshrine women's right to wear Islamic headscarves".

History

Background
Mustafa Kemal had the ambition to make Turkey a new modern Secular nation. In 1925, he removed Islam from the constitution and introduced a new Family Law modelled after the Swiss Family Law, and in the same year, he banned the traditional hat for men, the fez.  
Mustafa Kemal viewed modern clothing as an essential visual symbol of the new Secular nation and encouraged both women and men to wear modern fashion, but in contrast to his law against traditional wear for men, he never introduced a ban against the hijab. 
However, he appeared in public with his wife Latife Uşaki unveiled and arranged formal state receptions with dinner and dance were men and women could mingle, to encourage women to leave seclusion and adopt modern clothing, and in the mid 1920s, upper- and middle class Turkish women started to appear unveiled in public.

Banning of headscarves 

With a constitutional principle of official secularism, the Turkish government has traditionally banned women who wear headscarves from working in the public sector. The ban applies to teachers, lawyers, parliamentarians, and others working on state premises. The ban on headscarves in the civil service and educational and political institutions was expanded to cover non-state institutions. Female lawyers and journalists who refused to comply with the ban were expelled from public buildings such as courtrooms and universities.

In the late 1970s and early 1980s, the number of university students wearing headscarves increased substantially and in 1984, the first widespread application of headscarf ban came into effect at the universities, but throughout the 1980s and 1990s, the ban was not uniformly enforced and many students were able to graduate. The headscarf ban in public spaces, including schools and universities (public and private), courts of law, government offices and other official institutions, is only for students, workers and public servants. Hence, mothers of pupils or visitors have no problems at all entering the primary schools, but they would not be able to work as teachers. Similarly, at the courts of law, the ban only involves judges, attorneys, lawyers and other workers. Wearing headscarves in photos on official documents like licenses, passports, and university enrollment documents are also prohibited. Universities and schools refused to register women students unless they submit ID photographs with bared hair and neck.

A regulation dated 16 July 1982, specified that: the clothing and appearances of personnel working at public institutions; the rule that female civil servants' head must be uncovered.

An interpretation of this law in 1997 extended the ban to the wearing of headscarves in all universities in Turkey. The debate over headscarves in universities has been the most contentious of all and has been an important element in the politics of Turkey since 2000.

Education 
From 1997 to 2013, the Turkish military banned headscarves from all tertiary educational institutions on the ground that they weren’t compatible with secularism. This ban was lifted after 2013, but there is still a great divide between women who wear headscarves and those who don’t know when it comes to attaining an education. From 2003, when the Justice and Development Party and Recep Tayyip Erdoğan gained power, they have stated that they promoted education for women with programs such as "Hey Girls, Let's Go To School".  According to journalist Asli Aydintasbas  

However, their goal was not to deliver  gender equality. Like many of those that came before him, along with the history of Turkey that dates back to the ancient  Ottoman Empire, which was an Islamic nation, Women were seen as wives and mothers, not individuals who were meant to receive an education from any institution. Turkish Society is a patriarchal society, and because of that, education for women isn’t something popular amongst the public. The acquisition of education for headscarved women, along with the fact that although the ban has been lifted, it is still difficult for these women to receive an education, is all a part of Erdoğan’s agenda to promote Islamic beliefs and practices in Turkey. This idea of keeping women as housewives and mothers, not individuals who can obtain an education, is a prime example of what the Turkish prime minister advocates called  “Sunni Muslim Domination.”. Turkey is a predominantly Muslim and Patriarchal Society; In Turkey, they look towards the Islamic faith and their interpretation of said faith to influence the practices of society. 

After the ban was lifted decades after its initiation, it became difficult for women, both with or without a headscarf, to receive an education. Even though many steps have been taken to progress women’s equality in Turkey, There isn’t any subsequent or substantial evidence so far that proves that the ban on the acquisition of education for headscarved women did reduce the number of those women who received any credentials from these institutions.  Based on the patriarchal and Islamic government and society already in place, the number of women who are educated was already low. Before this ban, in the late 1970’s going to the early 1980s, there was an uptick in the number of university students who wore headscarves, and some managed to graduate with full credentials; however, after 1984, the ban spread across all schools, yet was not enforced until 1997. 

Progressive steps have been taken to further allow women with headscarves to receive an education. However, the effect of these steps has been minimal. Because the regulations in place by the government and the structure of society in Turkey are based on their interpretation of the Islamic faith and how it perceives women, the right to education still is one of the main battles that these women face today, which also limits them from working in the public sector & receiving education.

Workplace 
According to Country Reports 2007, women who wore headscarves and their supporters "were disciplined or lost their jobs in the public sector" (US 11 March 2008, Sec. 2.c). Human Rights Watch (HRW) reports that in late 2005, the Administrative Supreme Court ruled that a teacher was not eligible for a promotion in her school because she wore a headscarf outside of work (Jan. 2007). An immigration counselor at the Embassy of Canada in Ankara stated on 27 April 2005 correspondence with the Research Directorate that public servants are not permitted to wear a headscarf while on duty, but headscarved women may be employed in the private sector. In 12 April 2005 correspondence sent to the Research Directorate, a professor of political science specializing in women's issues in Turkey at Boğaziçi University in Istanbul indicated that women who wear a headscarf "could possibly be denied employment in private or government sectors." Conversely, some municipalities with a more traditional constituency might attempt to hire specifically those women who wear a headscarf (Professor 12 April 2005). The professor did add, however, that headscarved women generally experience difficulty in obtaining positions as teachers, judges, lawyers, or doctors in the public service (ibid.). More recent or corroborating information on the headscarf ban in the public service could not be found among the sources consulted by the Research Directorate.

The London-based Sunday Times reports that while the ban is officially in place only in the public sphere, many private firms similarly avoid hiring women who wear headscarves (6 May 2007). MERO notes that women who wear headscarves may have more difficulty finding a job or obtaining a desirable wage (Apr. 2008), although this could not be corroborated among the sources consulted by the Research Directorate.

Medical care 
According to the Sunday Times, headscarves are banned inside Turkish hospitals, and doctors may not don a headscarf on the job (6 May 2007). Nevertheless, MERO reports that secularists see Turkey's current administration as having a hidden religious agenda (The New York Times 19 February 2008; Washington Post 26 February 2008), doctors in some public hospitals have entered the premises wearing headscarves (MERO Apr. 2008).

The professor of political science at Boğaziçi University in Turkey stated that, in addition to never having come across any cases where women wearing headscarves had been denied access to medical care in private or public medical centres, he felt it would be unlikely that this would occur (12 April 2005). The Immigration Counsellor at the Embassy of Canada in Ankara stated that "women who wear headscarves have full access to medical care" (27 April 2005), though news reports  and NGO reports to the UN confirm that "women wearing the headscarf have been denied medical care in Turkish hospitals."

Social split
As of 2010, Turkish American author Elif Batuman, wrote that at least in Istanbul she encountered a Turkey "polarizing into two camps that were increasingly unable to communicate with each other".  According to  anthropologist Jenny White,   the white Turks attitude was infested with racism and classism: black Turks were "the underdogs": Recep Tayyip Erdoğan has "proudly" called himself "a black Turk".

Asli Aydintasbas and Busra Cebeci write that “uncovering”, i.e. no longer wearing the headscarf, is a right of passage for many women escaping "from small-town conservatism" in Turkey, and "may signal the beginning of a movement in the opposite direction" of Erdogan’s Islamization.

While the Turkish state pressured women not to wear headscarves, often family and society pressured women in the opposite direction.  Cebeci describes the "immense pressure" women feel from relatives "in most cases"   when they try to stop wearing headscarves –  

Aydintasbas sees the political forces working to ban hijab and to force women to wear hijab as mirror images, both oppressing women; and both facing resistance.

Controversial events 

 In 1968, a female public university student, Hatice Babacan, refused to remove her headscarf in university buildings.
 In 1998, a Turkish student was banned for wearing a headscarf at Istanbul University.
 In May 1999, the ban on headscarves in the public sphere hit the headlines when Merve Kavakçı was prevented from taking her oath in the National Assembly because she wore a headscarf. She was the newly elected MP of Istanbul of the pro-Islamist Virtue Party, and she refused demands to leave the building. The secular opposition members protested by chanting 'out' for 30 minutes, and the then prime minister Bülent Ecevit accused her of violating the principles of secularism. A state prosecutor investigated whether she might be put on trial for provoking religious hatred. She received much support from Iran, by the Ayatollah Ahmad Jannati, and hundreds of women demonstrating in support of the deputy. 
 In 2000, Nuray Bezirgan, a Turkish female student, wore a headscarf at her college final exams. A Turkish court sentenced her to six months in jail for "obstructing the education of others". The European Court of Human Rights upheld the ban in 2004, finding that the law did not violate the European Convention on Human Rights.  In October 2006, the European Court of Human Rights upheld the university ban again, rejecting a complaint filed by another Turkish university student.
 In October 2006, Turkish president Ahmet Necdet Sezer refused to allow AKP politicians whose wives wore headscarves to a ball marking Turkish independence, saying it would compromise and undermine the separation of mosque and state in Turkey.
 In late 2008 CHP (Republican People's Party) leader Deniz Baykal surprised supporters by allowing those who wear the çarşaf (chador) to become members of the party. The surprising move was viewed as a strategy to attract conservative voters to the party. Some criticized Baykal's move as an attempt to move the party towards the right.
 In March 2009, Kıymet Özgür, who wore the çarşaf (chador) was attacked by CHP members when she tried to get into an election bus of mayoral candidate Kemal Kılıçdaroğlu in Istanbul. It was later reported that she had disguised herself to test the party's new initiative.

Process of  lifting the ban 

Prime Minister Erdoğan campaigned in his victorious 2007 campaign with a promise of lifting the longstanding ban on headscarves in public institutions. However, as the Turkish deputies voted in Parliament, tens of thousands protested outside in favor of the ban.

On February 7, 2008, the Turkish Parliament passed an amendment to the constitution, allowing women to wear the headscarf in Turkish universities, arguing that many women would not seek an education if they could not wear the headscarf. The main political party, the Justice and Development Party, and a key opposition party, the Nationalist Movement Party claimed that it was an issue of human rights and freedoms. The Parliament voted 403–107 (a majority of 79 per cent) in favor of the first amendment, which was inserted into the constitution stating that everyone has the right to equal treatment from state institutions. However, the move resulted in opposition throughout Turkey. The country's educational board and numerous universities vowed to defy the new law. In addition, the main pro-secular, opposition party of the Republican People's Party asked the constitutional court to block the new law passed and viewed it as a move towards an Islamic state. Thousands of demonstrators supporting the ban also gathered near the Parliament against the move by the government.

After the failed attempt at lifting the ban against headscarves in public institutions in 2008, the Justice and Development Party arranged constitutional amendments in 2010 that would lead to lifting the ban against wearing headscarves in Turkish educational institutions. On October 8, 2013, the ban was lifted specifically at universities and government positions unless uniform was required, such as the military, police, and judiciary.  With the support of the Council of Higher Education, the Justice and Development Party was able to persuade women who wore headscarves to return to school. Two years later, the lift on the ban extended to judiciary roles in 2015 and the year following 2016, to the Turkish police force.

Lifting of ban annulled 
On 5 June 2008, Turkey's Constitutional Court annulled the parliament's proposed amendment intended to lift the headscarf ban, ruling that removing the ban was against the founding principles of the constitution. The highest court's decision to uphold the headscarf ban cannot be appealed (AP 7 June 2008).

More ban liftings
Headscarves had become a focal point of the conflict between the ruling Justice and Development Party (AKP) and the secularist establishment. The ruling was widely seen as a victory for Turks who claim this maintains Turkey's separation of state and religion. In 2013, the headscarf ban in public institutions was lifted through a decree, even though the ban officially stands through court decisions. The ban on wearing hijab in high schools ended in 2014.

In March 2017, the Ministry of Defence in Ankara announced a change in rules to allow women in the armed forces to wear headscarves with their uniforms, which sparked concerns from secularists over creeping Islamisation of the military.

In October 2022, ahead of the 2023 election, Turkey's government and opposition both pledged legal steps to establish women's right to wear Islamic headscarves, bringing an issue that previously caused severe splits back to the forefront of political discourse.

See also 
 Leyla Şahin v. Turkey
 Islamic dress in Europe
 Islam and clothing
 Islam in Turkey
 Secularism in Turkey
 Freedom of religion in Turkey
 Merve Kavakçı
 Snow (Pamuk novel)
 Kemalism

References 

Society of Turkey
Islamic female clothing
Women in Turkey
Controversies in Turkey
Hijab